WHCN (105.9 FM) is a commercial radio station licensed to Hartford, Connecticut.  It broadcasts a classic hits radio format and is owned by iHeartMedia, Inc.  It is called "The River 105.9," a reference to the Connecticut River. The studios and offices are on Columbus Boulevard in Hartford.  

The transmitter site is at West Peak State Park in nearby Meriden. In addition to a standard analog transmission, WHCN broadcasts using HD Radio technology.  Its HD2 digital subchannel formerly played electronic dance music and was known as "Club Jam EDM."  WHCN is one of the oldest FM stations, beginning as an experimental outlet in 1939.

Signal
WHCN is a Class B FM station.  It would normally transmit at 50,000 watts ERP (Effective Radiated Power) at a HAAT (Height Above Average Terrain) of 150 meters. Because WHCN's tower is 264 meters, it is limited to an ERP of 16,000 watts, in order to maintain an equivalent coverage area. 

Its signal is radiated using a directional pattern, with the maximum sent toward Hartford at 30° azimuth. It is reduced in other directions, and weakest toward the southwest, at 190° and 230° azimuth.  This is done to avoid interference with WQXR-FM, also on 105.9 MHz, whose transmitter is in New York City. In those directions, the signal is .45 of full power, or 7,200 watts; WQXR operates with reduced power (610 watts at 416 meters) to avoid interfering with WHCN.

History

Experimental authorization

In the 1930s, experiments were begun into establishing radio stations broadcasting on "Very High Frequency" (VHF) assignments above 30 MHz. Reception of stations operating on these frequencies tended to be limited to line-of-sight distances, so placing the transmitting antenna at as high an altitude as possible provided maximum coverage. Stations operating on these higher frequencies were known informally as "Apex" stations, and initially employed "amplitude modulation" (AM) transmissions like those used in the standard AM broadcast band. Franklin M. Doolittle, the owner of AM station WDRC in Hartford, obtained permission to establish an experimental Apex station, W1XSL, with a transmitter site located on Meriden Mountain.

Another innovation during the 1930s was the introduction of a competing transmission technology, "wide-band frequency modulation" (FM), which was developed in the United States by Edwin Howard Armstrong. This was promoted as being superior to AM transmissions, in particular due to its high fidelity and near immunity to static interference. On June 17, 1936 Armstrong formally demonstrated his FM system to the FCC. Doolittle was impressed with FM's potential, and in early 1939 announced plans to convert the Meriden experimental high frequency station, now operating under the call sign W1XPW, into an FM broadcasting station.

W1XPW's conversion to FM was reported to have been completed as of May 13, 1939, with the station now operating with 1,000 watts on 43.4 MHz. Following an irregular series of test transmissions, the station inaugurated regular programming on October 2,  with an initial schedule of 2 to 10 p.m. daily. W1XPW was the third FM station to broadcast on a regular schedule, after Edwin Armstrong's W2XMN in Alpine, New Jersey, and the Yankee Network's W1XOJ in Massachusetts. However, W2XMN was unaffiliated with any AM stations, and W1XOJ was owned by the Yankee radio network, so station publicity referred to W1XPW as the "first frequency-modulated outlet to be built by an independently-owned commercial broadcasting station" (WDRC). On January 4, 1940 W1XPW participated in the first demonstration of an FM over-the-air inter-city relay, which originated in Yonkers, New York, was received and relayed in turn to W1XPW by Armstrong's W2XMN in Alpine, then further relayed to W1XOJ in Massachusetts.

Commercial operation

In May 1940, the FCC authorized an FM band effective January 1, 1941, operating on 40 channels spanning 42–50 MHz. WDRC, Inc. was issued a Construction Permit for a station on 46.5 MHz that was assigned the call sign W65H. Effective November 1, 1943, the FCC modified its policy for FM callsigns, and the call sign was changed to WDRC-FM. In 1946, as part of a general relocation to a new FM band allocation, the station was reassigned to 94.3 MHz, and the following year  moved to 93.7 MHz.

In 1924-1925, Franklin Doolittle made the first stereo radio broadcasts, when the broadcasting station he had founded in 1922, WPAJ (WDRC after 1925), was temporarily authorized to broadcast left and right audio channels over two different frequencies on the AM band. In 1952 he returned to dual-transmitter stereo experimentation, when New York City's WQXR paired with its FM sister station, WQXR-FM, to transmit a stereo program that was relayed for rebroadcast by WDRC and WDRC-FM.

WDRC-FM's  call letters were changed to WFMQ on January 1, 1955. In 1957, the station was purchased by The Concert Network, Inc., a network of  FM stations that primarily provided classical music programming, whose affiliates included WBCN in Boston, WNCN in New York City, and WXCN in Providence, Rhode Island. WFMQ's call sign was changed to WHCN, and the next year the station moved to its current assignment of 105.9 MHz.

Rock music era

WHCN shifted from classical music to progressive rock in 1969.  The format was later flipped to mainstream album rock in late 1976.  Known as "106-WHCN", it was very successful in the 1970s and the 1980s. WHCN was home to the morning show "Picozzi and The Horn", up until the mid-1990s. Mike Picozzi would later move to rival rock station WCCC-FM, eventually becoming program director there.  WHCN flipped to classic rock in the mid-1990s to compete for the older rock audience that grew up with the station.  New owners switched the moniker to "105-9 WHCN," moving to a harder-edged classic rock format billed as "Classic Rock That Really Rocks". WHCN would be snapped up by Liberty Broadcasting, then SFX Broadcasting/Capstar, and then AMFM, which merged with iHeartMedia (then known as Clear Channel Communications) in 2000.

Move to adult hits
After years of declining ratings, the 33-year run of the WHCN brand came to an abrupt end in March 2002, when WHCN became known as "The River 105.9", retaining most of its on-air staff from its previous Classic Rock incarnation. The station's "The Rock" slogan and later the station's former Asylum Street studios would be adopted by one-time rival WCCC. WHCN's playlist was more diverse than other stations in the market, which helped it shoot up in ratings from 13th place to 5th place within a year.

At one time the station's HD2 signal was a rock format known as "Deep Tracks", that played less familiar titles. It was later changed to Club Jam EDM.

See also

References

External links
 

FCC History Cards for WHCN (covering 1940-1981 as W65H / WDRC-FM / WFMQ)

HCN
Radio stations established in 1939
IHeartMedia radio stations
1939 establishments in Connecticut